Phryneta immaculata is a species of beetle in the family Cerambycidae. It was described by Hintz in 1911. It is known from the Democratic Republic of the Congo.

References

Phrynetini
Beetles described in 1911
Endemic fauna of the Democratic Republic of the Congo